Martin Donovan (born Carlos Enrique Varela y Peralta Ramos; January 21, 1950) is an Argentine screenwriter and film director. Donovan has developed his career working mainly in United Kingdom, and he is mostly recognized as the co-writer and director of the cult film Apartment Zero (1989), and for his co-written script for Death Becomes Her (1992).

Biography

Early life 
Martin Donovan was born in the city of Buenos Aires as Carlos Enrique Varela Peralta Ramos. His great-great-grandfather was Patricio Peralta Ramos, founder of the city of Mar del Plata. He was also the eldest of seven brothers and one sister, and viewed as the "strange one of the family" since the very beginning. He connected with movies and the theater since he was 6 or 7 years old and he voraciously read everything. His passion for films was shown, for instance, when he became desperate to see A Streetcar Named Desire. The young Martin would cry: "Why can't I see A Streetcar Named Desire?!", to which his mother would reply: "Because you're 8! Go wash your hands and come to the table!". In 1961, at the age of 11, he wrote a letter to renowned filmmaker Luchino Visconti (addressing the envelope as "Luchino Visconti, Italy, Europe"). Visconti received the letter and replied; 8 years later Martin Donovan would be at his side as his assistant.

In 1963 he was sent to boarding school at Colegio de la Inmaculada Concepción in Santa Fe Province, where Eduardo Peralta Ramos SJ, Martin's mother's elder brother, was a teacher and the spiritual father of Jorge Bergoglio, known today as Pope Francis. Donovan went back home in 1964, and a couple of months later he escaped his parents’ home through a window, leaving a letter to his mother, which read: "Don't cry mama, I need to find myself..." He soon became a runaway in Buenos Aires during summer, with only his maternal grandmother, Celia Lertora de Peralta Ramos - whom Martin called "Mamama" -, as his accomplice. Those summer months in Buenos Aires while the police was searching all over for him became a fundamental period in his life.

Career 
Donovan began his career acting in Italian films, such as Fellini's Satyricon (1969), and assisted Luchino Visconti in several films. After traveling to England in the mid-60s he joined a theater company called Nuvact Studio International and collaborated with other directors such as Peter Brook, John Schlesinger and Vittorio De Sica. At the same time, Donovan consistently participated as a screenwriter and a story/script consultant in many British and American TV series. His first film as a director, State of Wonder (1984), was featured in the Official Selection at the Berlin Film Festival of that same year.

Donovan's second work as a director, Apartment Zero (1989), a British-Argentine coproduction, was entirely filmed in Buenos Aires and features Hart Bochner and a then relatively unknown Colin Firth in one of his first starring roles, together with a mostly Argentine cast. It is a complex suspense story with psychodrama elements, in the tradition of Joseph Losey and Roman Polanski's movies. The film has gained a strong cult following over the years.

His most important work in Hollywood was the screenplay for the classic black comedy Death Becomes Her (1992), which was directed by Robert Zemeckis and starred Meryl Streep, Goldie Hawn and Bruce Willis. 

In 1996 he wrote and directed Somebody Is Waiting, a drama starring Gabriel Byrne, Nastassja Kinski and Johnny Whitworth.

References

External links
 
 Martin Donovan at Cinenacional.com

1950 births
Living people
British male screenwriters
People from Buenos Aires
Argentine male film actors
Argentine film directors
Argentine film producers
Argentine screenwriters
Argentine male writers
20th-century Argentine male actors
Writers from Buenos Aires